The Skyline SL-222 is a three-bladed, twin-engined light utility helicopter developed by the Ukrainian company Skyline. It made its first flight in 2011 and is intended to compete on the civil market in the same low-cost category as the popular Robinson R22.

Design and development
The SL-222 is a pod and boom style helicopter, its twin  Hirth 3071 ES water cooled, fuel injected, three cylinder two stroke mounted at the rear of the pod and driving a three blade rotor.  The tail rotor has two blades and there is a T-tail with a long underfin.  The two occupants sit under streamlined glazing in side by side seats. Entry is by a pair of doors, one on each side.  The SL-222 has a fixed skid undercarriage.

Structurally, the SL-222 is built around a pair of longitudinal Duralumin spars and a tube steel truss supporting the engines, drive train, fuel tanks, cabin floor and undercarriage.  The cabin floor and tailboom are constructed from aluminium alloy. Carbon fibre sandwich materials are used elsewhere and rotors are also composites.

The SL-122 made its first circular flight on or before 16 February 2011.

Specifications (SL-222)

References

External links
 Youtube video of helicopter taking off

2010s Ukrainian helicopters
2010s Ukrainian civil utility aircraft
SL-222
Aircraft first flown in 2011
Twin-engined piston helicopters